Sporoschisma is a genus of fungi within the Chaetosphaeriaceae family.

Species
Sporoschisma ampullula
Sporoschisma connari
Sporoschisma juniperi
Sporoschisma juvenile
Sporoschisma montellicum
Sporoschisma mori
Sporoschisma nigroseptatum
Sporoschisma parcicuneatum
Sporoschisma phaeocentron
Sporoschisma stilboideum
Sporoschisma tracyi
Sporoschisma uniseptatum

External links

Sordariomycetes genera
Chaetosphaeriales
Taxa named by Christopher Edmund Broome
Taxa named by Miles Joseph Berkeley
Taxa described in 1847